Reginald Allen may refer to:
 Reginald Allen (Australian cricketer) (1858–1952), Australian cricketer
 Reginald Allen (English cricketer) (1893–1950), English cricketer, played for Yorkshire 1921–25
 Reginald Allen, 1st Baron Allen of Hurtwood (1889–1939), British politician known as Clifford Allen
 Reg Allen (1919–1976), English football (soccer) goalkeeper
 Reg Allen (set decorator) (1917–1989)

See also
Allen (surname)